Shalil or Shelil may refer to:
 Shalil-e Olya, Chaharmahal and Bakhtiari Province, Iran
 Shalil-e Sofla, Chaharmahal and Bakhtiari Province, Iran
 Shalil Rural District,  Chaharmahal and Bakhtiari Province, Iran
 Shalil, Khwahan, Afghanistan